Titiotus californicus is a species of araneomorphic Araneae of the family Zoropsidae that can be found in the state of California, after which it is aptly named. The species was first described by Eugène Simon in 1897 in his encyclopedic work Histoire Naturelle des Araignées.

References 

Zoropsidae
Spiders of the United States
Spiders described in 1897